KWSU may refer to:

 KWSU-TV, a television station (channel 10 analog/17 digital) licensed to Pullman, Washington, United States
 KWSU (AM), a radio station (1250 AM) licensed to Pullman, Washington, United States